Matt Jones (born March 7, 1993) is an American football running back who is a free agent. He played college football for the University of Florida, and was drafted by the Washington Redskins in the third round of the 2015 NFL Draft. He has also played for the Indianapolis Colts, Philadelphia Eagles, and St. Louis BattleHawks.

Early years
Jones attended Armwood High School in Seffner, Florida, where he played high school football. He helped lead Armwood to a 15-0 record and the FHSAA Class 6A Championship and #2 national ranking his senior year while rushing for 896 yards and 10 touchdowns despite missing four games and also hauling in nine catches for 197 yards and three more scores. He earned an Honorable Mention All-State honors. He also competed in track and field at Armwood.

Jones was rated as a four-star recruit by Rivals.com and was ranked as the 15th best running back in his class. He committed to the University of Florida to play college football.

College career
Jones appeared in 12 games as a true freshman in 2012. He rushed for 275 yards on 52 carries with three touchdowns. As a sophomore in 2013, Jones played in only five games due to a torn meniscus. He finished the year with 339 yards on 79 carries with two touchdowns. He returned from the injury for his junior season in 2014. In 2014, he had 166 carries for 817 rushing yards and six rushing touchdowns.

Jones entered the 2015 NFL Draft, after his junior season.

Professional career

Washington Redskins

The Washington Redskins selected Jones with the 95th overall pick of the 2015 NFL Draft. He signed a four-year contract on May 11, 2015. On September 20, 2015, against the St. Louis Rams, Jones ran 39 yards for a touchdown, which was his longest run from scrimmage. Jones would run for a career-high 123 yards and a career-high 2 touchdowns. On November 15, 2015, against the New Orleans Saints, Jones caught a pass and ran 78 yards for a touchdown, which was his 1st career receiving touchdown. He would finish with a career-high 131 receiving yards. On November 29, 2015, against the New York Giants, Jones caught a pass and ran for 45 yards. He finished his rookie season with 144 carries for 490 rushing yards and three rushing touchdowns.

He began the season cemented as the starting running back after Alfred Morris left via free agency in the 2016 offseason. Jones suffered a knee injury on October 23, 2016, during a 20-17 loss to the Detroit Lions. He was replaced by rookie Robert Kelley for the following game and officially lost his starting position after Kelley performed well in Jones' absence. The following week, he was relegated to the third-string behind Kelley and Chris Thompson. He finished the 2016 season with 99 carries for 460 rushing yards and three rushing touchdowns.

On September 2, 2017, Jones was waived by the Redskins.

Indianapolis Colts
Jones was claimed off waivers by the Indianapolis Colts on September 3, 2017. He was waived on September 9, 2017 and was re-signed to the practice squad. He was promoted to the active roster on September 22, 2017. He was waived by the Colts on December 2, 2017, but re-signed two days later. He finished the 2017 season with five carries for 14 yards in five games. He was waived by the Colts on May 1, 2018.

Philadelphia Eagles
On May 9, 2018, Jones signed a two-year contract with the Philadelphia Eagles. He was released on September 1, 2018.

St. Louis BattleHawks
In October 2019, Jones was selected by the St. Louis BattleHawks in the 2020 XFL Draft. He was named to the mid-season All-XFL team after rushing for 314 yards and a touchdown on 80 rushes, and having 25 receiving yards and a touchdown. He had his contract terminated when the league suspended operations on April 10, 2020.

Jones played with the Sea Lions of The Spring League in 2021.

Vegas Vipers
Jones was selected in the fifth round of the 2023 XFL Skill Players Draft, by the Vegas Vipers. He was released on January 21, 2023.

References

External links
Florida Gators bio
Washington Redskins bio

1993 births
Living people
American football running backs
Florida Gators football players
Sportspeople from Hillsborough County, Florida
Players of American football from Florida
Washington Redskins players
Indianapolis Colts players
Philadelphia Eagles players
St. Louis BattleHawks players
The Spring League players
Vegas Vipers players